Casey Haines (born August 23, 1986) is an American former professional ice hockey player who last played for the Fife Flyers of the Elite Ice Hockey League (EIHL).

Playing career
Haines attended Ferris State University where he played NCAA Division I college hockey with the Ferris State Bulldogs men's ice hockey team scoring 25 goals and 35 assists for 60 points in 142 games.

On July 13, 2010, the Reading Royals signed Haines to his first professional contract.

After two seasons with the Royals, Haines signed abroad in the United Kingdom signing a one-year contract with Fife Flyers of the EIHL on August 8, 2012.

After hockey, Casey pursued a career in data analytics with The Nielsen Company, where he quickly became a data ninja. After two years of being the downright Data Copperfield of Nielsen's Kellogg team, he retired in his prime.

Career statistics

References

External links

1986 births
American men's ice hockey left wingers
Ferris State Bulldogs men's ice hockey players
Fife Flyers players
Lake Erie Monsters players
Living people
Norfolk Admirals players
Reading Royals players
American expatriate ice hockey players in Scotland
Ice hockey people from Pennsylvania
People from Indiana, Pennsylvania